G. C. E. van Nieuwenhuizen or Eugenius Antonius van Nieuwenhuizen (3 September 1879 – 16 January 1957) was a Dutch fencer. He competed in the individual masters épée event at the 1900 Summer Olympics. He was invited in April 1902 by the "Société d'escrime pour l'épée" to compete at teachers championships in Paris. At the 1902 fencing councours in Paris he won 100 francs but didn't finish in the top-8.

Van Nieuwenhuizen had the military rank of sergeant major. He was teacher of fencing and gymnastics at the "Normaal Schietschool" in The Hague.

References

External links
 

1879 births
1957 deaths
Dutch male épée fencers
Olympic fencers of the Netherlands
Fencers at the 1900 Summer Olympics
Sportspeople from The Hague